Ashish Kumar Louho (10 October 1937 – 4 November 1994) was a Bangladeshi film actor, playwright, dialogue writer and story writer. He won Bangladesh National Film Award for Best Supporting Actor for his role in the film Parineeta (1986).

Career
Louho debuted his acting career through the film Harano Din.

Louho is best known for his role as Heera in the television series, Tri Rotno, broadcast by Bangladesh Television.

Works

References

External links

1937 births
1994 deaths
Bengali Hindus
Bangladeshi Hindus
People from Mymensingh District
Bangladeshi male film actors
Best Supporting Actor National Film Award (Bangladesh) winners
Place of death missing